Vologda Oblast was an administrative division (an oblast) of Vologda Viceroyalty of the Russian Empire, which existed in 1780–1796.

References

Oblasts of the Russian Empire
States and territories established in 1780
1796 disestablishments
1780 establishments in the Russian Empire